The International Thespian Society (ITS) is an honor society for high school and middle school theatre students. It is a division of the Educational Theatre Association. Thespian troupes serve students in grades 9–12; Junior Thespian troupes serve students in grades 6 through 8. A few famous ITS alumni include Tom Hanks, Val Kilmer, James Marsters, Julia Louis-Dreyfus, and Stephen Schwartz. Festivals are held annually at the state and national levels. Each June the organization holds the International Thespian Festival. For 25 years it was held at the University of Nebraska-Lincoln. As of 2019 it is being held at Indiana University-Bloomington where the first ITF was held in 1941. Membership currently stands at approximately 139,000 student members across 5,000 schools. The one millionth Thespian was inducted in 1976 and the two millionth Thespian was inducted in 2009. As of 2019, there have been over 2.4 million Thespians inducted.

History 
The International Thespian Society was founded in 1929 in Fairmont, West Virginia. Originally named National Thespians, the society was founded by Dr. Paul Opp, Earnest Bavely and Harry T. Leeper. National Thespians was an honorary organization for high school theater students who earned membership through participation in their schools' theatre programs. The organization consisted of troupes, each linked to a school. The first troupe was formed by Dr. Earl Blank at Natrona County High School in Casper, Wyoming.

At the end of the 1928–1929 school year there were 71 troupes across 26 states. In October, 1929, the first issue of The High School Thespian, "official organ of National Thespians" was published. The National Thespian headquarters was moved to Cincinnati during the year 1935. That same year, the society was renamed The National Thespian Dramatic Honor Society. The society held its first National High School Drama Conference and Play Production Festival in 1941 at Indiana University, which later became a bi-annual event. The High School Thespian became Dramatics in 1944.

In October 1945, The National Thespian Dramatic Honor Society was again renamed the National Thespian Society. As the Thespian Society reached its 25th anniversary in 1954, 1,432 Thespian troupes existed across forty-eight states and the then-territories of Alaska, Hawaii, and the Canal Zone, as well as Canada and Japan. In 1969 the organization's name was changed to the title it still holds today: The International Thespian Society. June 1982 marked a name change for the National High School Drama Conference and Play Production Festival, turning it into the Thespian Festival, as it is still called today. The Thespian Festival also began an annual schedule for the first time.

The Society offered its first set of summertime retreats for high school theatre directors in 1986, an activity that would eventually grow into a professional association called the Theatre Education Association. In 1989 the ITS board established the Educational Theatre Association (EdTA), meant to oversee both the Thespian Society and the Theatre Education Association, and launched Teaching Theatre, a quarterly journal for theatre educators. The Theatre Education Association was eventually absorbed completely into the EdTA and thus its title is no longer used.

1990 marks the birth of the Junior Thespians branch of ITS, extending the reach of the society to middle school theatre students. The EdTA helped to write the theatre section of the National Standards for Arts Education, the first set of guidelines for the arts education field, in 1994. By 2012, International Thespian Society had formed a strong bond with the charity organization Broadway Cares/Equity Fights AIDS and raised more than $1 million for their benefit. 2015 marked the EdTA's launch of JumpStart Theatre, which brings sustainable musical theatre programs to underserved middle schools where there currently are none, and the creation of an ITS branch in China.

Thespian Chapters 
Chapters are created in order to support the mission of the International Thespian Society. They are led by a chapter director who is supported and assisted by a chapter board. As of 2022, there are 47 active chapters:

Maine, Massachusetts, Rhode Island, Connecticut, New York, Pennsylvania, New Jersey, Maryland, Virginia, West Virginia, Ohio, North Carolina, South Carolina, Kentucky, Tennessee, Georgia, Alabama, Mississippi, Florida, Delaware, Louisiana, Arkansas, Missouri, Illinois, Indiana, Michigan, Wisconsin, Iowa, Minnesota, Nebraska, Kansas, Oklahoma, Texas, Montana, Wyoming, Colorado, New Mexico, Arizona, Idaho, Washington, Oregon, Nevada, California, Hawaii, the Western Pacific Islands, British Columbia, and China.

Thespian Induction and Promotion 
The International Thespian Society allows for the induction of high school and middle school students attending ITS affiliated schools, based on the quality and quantity of work in all realms of theatre. Points can be earned from participation in productions (either on stage or backstage), Thespian Festivals, seeing other theatre's productions, and holding an officer position in a Thespian troupe.

Induction ceremonies vary from troupe to troupe, but most are run by the troupe's officers and director. They include, at the very least, a brief summation of the Society's history, followed by a listing of the names and achievements of each new inductee, and then a reciting of the Society's pledge by all new and existing members. The pledge is as follows: "I promise to uphold the aims and ideals of the International Thespian Society. I am a student of theatre and excellence is my ideal. I promise to perform my part as well as I can; to accept praise and criticism with grace; to cooperate with my fellow thespians and work for the good of the troupe; and to share my love of theatre."After induction, members can continue to earn points in order to move up through the International Thespian Society ranking system.

Student Leadership
At the high school level there are various offices possible, including, but not limited to, President, Vice President, Treasurer, Secretary, and Historian. There are also state, provincial, and international student leaders elected annually by their respective student bodies. The International Thespian Officers are student members elected to represent the student membership. They suggest policy and service changes to the Educational Theatre Association Board, and take an active role in training, chapter conferences, and the annual International Thespian Festival. There are also State Thespian Officers and Provincial Thespian Officers, elected to manage such events as State Thespian Festivals, Provincial Thespian Festivals, and local Junior Thespian Festivals.

References

External links

 Broadway Cares/Equity Fights AIDS
 EdTA/ITS official website
 JumpStart Theatre
 Junior International Thespian Society
 Troupes List

High school honor societies
Student theatre
Theatrical organizations in the United States
Theatrical organizations in Canada